John Richard Handy III (born February 3, 1933) is an American jazz musician most commonly associated with the alto saxophone. He also sings and plays the tenor and baritone saxophone, saxello, clarinet, and oboe.

Biography
Handy was born in Dallas, Texas, United States. He first came to prominence while working for Charles Mingus in the 1950s. In the 1960s, Handy led several groups, among them a quintet with Michael White, violin, Jerry Hahn, guitar, Don Thompson, bass, and Terry Clarke, drums. This group's performance at the 1965 Monterey Jazz Festival was recorded and released as an album; Handy received Grammy nominations for "Spanish Lady" (jazz performance) and "If Only We Knew" (jazz composition). 

After completing high school at McClymonds High School in Oakland, he studied music at San Francisco State College, interrupted by service during the Korean War, graduating in 1958. Following graduation, he moved to New York City. Handy has taught music history and performance at San Francisco State University, Stanford University, the University of California, Berkeley, and the San Francisco Conservatory of Music.

In the 1980s he worked in the project Bebop & Beyond, which recorded tribute albums to Dizzy Gillespie and Thelonious Monk. His son, John Richard Handy IV, is a drummer who has played with Handy on occasion.

In 2009, he received the Beacon Award from SF JAZZ.

Discography

As leader 
 In the Vernacular (Roulette, 1959)
 No Coast Jazz (Roulette, 1960)
 Jazz (Roulette, 1962)
 Recorded Live at the Monterey Jazz Festival (Columbia, 1966)
 The 2nd John Handy Album (Columbia, 1966)
 New View (Columbia, 1967)
 Projections (Columbia, 1968)
 Karuna Supreme (MPS, 1975) with Ali Akbar Khan
 Hard Work (Impulse!, 1976)
 Carnival (Impulse! 1977)
 Where Go the Boats (Warner Bros., 1978)
 Handy Dandy Man (Warner Bros., 1978)
 Rainbow (MPS, 1980) with Ali Akbar Khan and Dr. L. Subramaniam
 Excursion in Blue (Quartet, 1988)
 Centerpiece (Milestone, 1989) with CLASS
 Live at the Monterey Jazz Festival (Koch, 1996)
 Live at Yoshi's Nightspot (Boulevard, 1996)
 John Handy's Musical Dreamland (Boulevard, 1996)

As sideman
With Brass Fever
 Brass Fever (Impulse!, 1975)
 Time Is Running Out (Impulse!, 1976)

With Charles Mingus
 Jazz Portraits: Mingus in Wonderland (United Artists, 1959)
 Mingus Ah Um (Columbia, 1959)
 Mingus Dynasty (Columbia, 1959)
 Blues & Roots (Atlantic, 1960)
 Right Now: Live at the Jazz Workshop (Fantasy, 1964)

With Mingus Dynasty
 Live at the Theatre Boulogne-Billancourt/Paris, Vol. 1 (Soul Note, 1988)
 Live at the Theatre Boulogne-Billancourt/Paris, Vol. 2 (Soul Note, 1988)

References

External links 
 
 John Handy talks about the Fillmore neighborhood and Bop City (1999)
 Jazz Weekly interview with Handy

1933 births
Living people
American jazz composers
American male jazz composers
American jazz alto saxophonists
American male saxophonists
African-American saxophonists
Columbia Records artists
Impulse! Records artists
MPS Records artists
San Francisco State University faculty
21st-century American saxophonists
21st-century American male musicians
Mingus Dynasty (band) members
Bebop & Beyond members
Brass Fever members
21st-century African-American musicians
20th-century African-American people